Bastilla fulvotaenia is a moth of the family Noctuidae. It is found from the Indian subregion and Sri Lanka, Taiwan to Lombok, Seram and Buru. Adult is a fruit-piercer.

Description
Its wingspan is about 70–80 mm. Males with a cleft running the whole length of the mid-tibia and containing a mass of flocculent scales. Body reddish brown. Forewings with purplish suffused medial band and postmedial line dark throughout, and with an indistinct dentate line beyond it. Hindwings with a medial orange band, which is wide towards costa.

The larvae feed on Glochidion species.

References

External links
Species info

Bastilla (moth)
Moths of Asia
Moths of Japan
Moths described in 1852